Bengt Ingmar Lindroos (22 September 1918 – 22 August 2010) was a Swedish architect.

Lindroos started drafting houses for a local builder at the age of 17 years and received his formal education at the Royal Institute of Technology from 1942-45.

After being employed by Sven Markelius, he opened an office together with Hans Borgström in 1954. He designed the Kaknästornet television tower in 1967. He was awarded the Prince Eugen Medal in 1983.

He designed in the 1986 Kasper Salin Prize-winning building block Kvarteret Drottningen. He also designed the prize of the competition.

Death
Lindroos died on 22 August 2010, aged 92.

Bibliography
Och så vidare- (1989)
Att vara arkitekt kan vara att... (2010)

References
 

1918 births
2010 deaths
People from Finspång Municipality
Swedish architects
KTH Royal Institute of Technology alumni
Place of death missing
Recipients of the Prince Eugen Medal